Not Enough Shouting is a live album by Scottish Celtic rock band Wolfstone. It was recorded after the success of their comeback album Seven. The album was their first album on their own label, Once Bitten Records.

Track listing
 "Psycho Woman" - 3:39
 "Brave Boys" - 4:58
 "Quinie fae Rhynie" - 3:32
Struan & Frazer's
Quinie fae Rhynie
 "Gillies" - 6:40
The Sleeping Tune
The Noose and the Gillies
 "Crowfeathers" - 4:59
 "Ballavanich" - 6:09
The Boys from Ballavanich
Mrs. Crehan's
 "Black Dog" - 3:47
 "John Simmers" - 2:05
 "J-Time" - 4:39
 "Wild and the Free" - 4:39
 "Clueless" - 4:42
The Wild Monkey Dance
Clueless
Richard Dwyer's Reel
Sandy MacLeod of Garafad	
 "The Prophet" - 4:14
 "Tinnie Run" - 3:40
The Road to Mount Tinnie Run
The Boys of Ballymoat
Alan MacPherson of Mosspark
 "Maggie's" - 4:47
Maggie's Pancakes
In and out the Harbour

Wolfstone albums
2000 live albums